Jacques Seiler (1928–2004) was a French actor.

Selected filmography

 On Foot, on Horse, and on Wheels (1957) - Le garçon sortant du 'Bean's' (uncredited)
 Ces dames préfèrent le mambo (1957) - Henri Bates - le steward
 Le septième ciel (1958) - Le curé (uncredited)
 Be Beautiful But Shut Up (1958) - Un inspecteur (uncredited)
 The Mask of the Gorilla (1958) - L'inspecteur-principal Antier
 A Dog, a Mouse, and a Sputnik (1958) - Un brigadier (uncredited)
 Head Against the Wall (1959) - Un infirmier
 The Road to Shame (1959) - Le policier dans la voiture (uncredited)
 Women Are Like That (1960) - Le commissaire
 Le caïd (1960) - Pietro
 Le Miracle des loups (1961) - L'héraut
 The Three Musketeers (1961) - Grimaud
 La dénonciation (1962) - L'homme à la 403 noire
 The Mysteries of Paris (1962) - Un acolyte
 Le chevalier de Pardaillan (1962) - La Pince
 Une blonde comme ça (1963)
 Les Bricoleurs (1963) - Le majordome du comte
 Mathias Sandorf (1963)
 Vice and Virtue (1963) - Baron Teltmann
 People in Luck (1963) - Le barman (segment "Le yacht") (uncredited)
 Sweet and Sour (1963) - Le policier
 À toi de faire... mignonne (1963)
 La belle vie (1963) - Le gendarme à la convocation (uncredited)
 Gibraltar (1964) - Kovacks
 The Gorillas (1964) - Le valet
 Le Majordome (1965) - Albert
 Chappaqua (1966)
 Who Are You, Polly Maggoo? (1966) - Le couturier Isidore Ducasse
 The Night of the Generals (1967) - Maître d'hôtel (uncredited)
 Le Désir attrapé par la queue (1967) - Big Foot
 Les encerclés (1967) - Barre
 The Return of Monte Cristo (1968) - Le patron du bar
 Erotissimo (1969) - Le bonimenteur (uncredited)
 The Blood Rose (1970) - Le policier
 Les Bidasses en folie (1971) - Sergeant Bellec
 The New Adventures of Vidocq (1971-1973, TV Series) - Desfossé
 L'oeuf (1972) - L'ancien mousse
 Stadium Nuts (1972) - Le directeur sportif de l'équipe cycliste
 The Big Store (1973) - Jacques
 Les quatre Charlots mousquetaires (1974) - Rochefort
 Les Charlots en folie: À nous quatre Cardinal! (1974) - Rochefort
 Les bidasses s'en vont en guerre (1974) - Sergent Bellec
 Playing with Fire (1975) - Le chauffeur de taxi / Le domestique d'Erica / Le prêtre
 One Can Always Dream (1991) - Verlinden
 Merci la vie (1991) - Inspector
 Hey Stranger (1994) - Frans
 Don't Let Me Die on a Sunday (1998) - Le passeur
 Requiem (2001) - Kaloustian (final film role)

1928 births
2004 deaths
French theatre directors
Male actors from Paris
French male film actors
French male television actors